Pak Kong is a village in Sai Kung Peninsula, Hong Kong.

Nearby villages include Pak Kong Au, Mau Ping New Village and Wong Chuk Shan New Village.

Administration
Pak Kong is a recognized village under the New Territories Small House Policy.

History
Pak Kong was first settled by tenants of the Wong clan, in the mid-16th century. It is a multi-surname village, with the clans resident there today being the Lok, Cheng, Lei, Lau, and Leung.

At the time of the 1911 census, the population of Pak Kong was 190. The number of males was 75.

Features
There is a Tin Hau Temple in Pak Kong.

Transportation
Pak Kong is connected to Hiram's Highway via Pak Kong Road.

The Pak Kong Ancient Trail is a hiking trail connecting Pak Kong to Mau Ping, uphill within Ma On Shan Country Park, and further to Sha Tin.

References

Further reading

External links

 Delineation of area of existing village Pak Kong (Sai Kung) for election of resident representative (2019 to 2022)
 Nui Po Au - Luk Chau Au - Pak Kong hiking trail

Sai Kung Peninsula
Villages in Sai Kung District, Hong Kong